Margaret Allan may refer to:

Margaret Allan (racing driver) (1909–1998), Scottish motor racing driver and journalist
Margaret Allan (romance author) (1922–2017), English author of romantic fiction
Margaret Theadora Allan (1889–1968), community worker and organizing secretary for the Travellers' Aid Society of New South Wales
William Thomas Quick (born 1946), American science fiction author who sometimes writes under the pen name Margaret Allan